Isopropyl aminoethylmethyl phosphonite (NATO designation QL), also known as O-(2-diisopropylaminoethyl) O′-ethyl methylphosphonite, is a precursor chemical to the nerve agent VX  and VR-56. It is a colorless liquid with a strong fishy odor, and is slightly soluble in water.

Synthesis
QL is manufactured by reacting diethyl methylphosphonite with 2-(diisopropylamino)ethanol.

Uses in chemical warfare
QL is a component in binary chemical weapons, mainly VX nerve agent. It, along with methylphosphonyl difluoride (DF), was developed during the 1980s in order to replace an aging stockpile of unitary chemical weapons. QL is listed as a Schedule 1 chemical by the Chemical Weapons Convention.

Toxicity
QL itself is a relatively non-toxic chemical. However, when reacting with sulfur, the corresponding sulfide of QL isomerizes into the highly toxic VX molecule.

References

Nerve agent precursors
Organophosphonites
Diisopropylamino compounds